"I Know" is the debut single by pop rock musician Drake Bell and is the first single off his second album, It's Only Time.  It was released on October 17, 2006 in the United States, and as a digital download on November 21, 2006. The video for "I Know" premiered on MTV's TRL on November 9, 2006. It peaked at No. 55 on the Mediabase Charts with 295 spins. He performed this song on MTV's TRL on December 6, 2006.

Track listing
U.S. promo CD 21747-2

Music video
The video depicts a famous musician (played by Bell) who seduces and flatters young women, which is intended to make his supposed girlfriend (played by Melissa Lingafelt) angry and jealous. She is meanwhile falling in love with an unpopular musician, who happens to be Bell himself. Bell is seen throughout the video singing the song, joined by his band, while playing a grand piano. In the end, the girl finds him.

The music video for "I Know" has received over 35.5 million views on YouTube.

Personnel
Drake Bell – vocals, guitar
Backhouse Mike – bass, guitar, keyboards, percussion, backing vocals
Joe Travers – drums
C.J. Abraham – backing vocals
Alyssa Griffith – backing vocals
Rob Jacobs – mixing

References

External links
"I Know" at Drake Bell's official Myspace
"I Know" music video at MTV.com

2006 singles
Drake Bell songs
2006 songs
Songs written by Drake Bell
Universal Motown Records singles
Universal Music Group singles